Dorymyrmex goeldii is a species of ant in the genus Dorymyrmex. Described by Forel in 1904, the species is endemic to Brazil.

References

Dorymyrmex
Hymenoptera of South America
Insects described in 1904